An ait (like eight) or eyot is a small island. It is especially used to refer to river islands found on the River Thames and its tributaries in England.

Aits are typically formed by the deposit of sediment in the water, which accumulates. An ait is characteristically long and narrow, and may become a permanent island should it become secured and protected by growing vegetation. However, aits may also be eroded: the resulting sediment is deposited further downstream and could result in another ait. A channel with numerous aits is called a braided channel.

Etymology
The word derives from Old English iggath (or igeth); the root of the word, ieg, meaning island, with a diminutive suffix.

References in literature

Although not common in 21st-century English, "ait" or "eyot" appears in J. R. R. Tolkien's The Lord of the Rings, Charles Dickens's Bleak House, and Thackeray's Vanity Fair.

Joyce Cary used "eyot" in The Horse's Mouth – "Sun was in the bank. Streak of salmon below. Salmon trout above soaking into wash blue. River whirling along so fast that its skin was pulled into wrinkles like silk dragged over the floor. Shot silk. Fresh breeze off the eyot. Sharp as spring frost. Ruffling under the silk-like muscles in a nervous horse.  Ruffling under my grief like ice and hot daggers".

More recently, "eyot" was used by Terry Pratchett in the first of the Discworld books, The Colour of Magic.  It also appears in The Pope's Rhinoceros by Lawrence Norfolk.

See also

References

External links  
 

Fluvial landforms
Islands of England
Islands of the River Thames

an:Mechana
mk:Средорек